Ryan Trout (born November 9, 1978) is an American former professional soccer player.

Trout was drafted in the fourth round of the 2001 MLS SuperDraft (41st overall) by Colorado Rapids, but did not sign with the club. He played professionally for five seasons with Charleston Battery, Rochester Raging Rhinos and Vancouver Whitecaps.

Trout also represented the United States at the 1995 FIFA U-17 World Championship in Ecuador.

References

External links
Virginia Cavaliers bio

1978 births
Living people
American soccer players
American expatriate soccer players
Virginia Cavaliers men's soccer players
Charleston Battery players
Rochester New York FC players
Vancouver Whitecaps (1986–2010) players
Association football midfielders
Soccer players from Pennsylvania
Expatriate soccer players in Canada
Colorado Rapids draft picks
A-League (1995–2004) players
USL First Division players
United States men's youth international soccer players